Thierry Tinmar (born 19 May 1963) is a Martiniquais former professional football player and manager. As a player, he was a centre-back. He notably played for Paris Saint-Germain, Laval, and Red Star in France before representing the Martinique national team in 1993.

Club career 
Originally from Martinique, Tinmar was a product of the Paris Saint-Germain Academy. Integrating the first team during the 1984–85 season, he made a total of 22 appearances in all competitions. PSG reached the Coupe de France final that season, but lost 1–0 to Monaco. He signed for fellow Division 1 club Laval at the end of the campaign.

After one season with Laval, Tinmar signed with Division 2 club Red Star. He would also stay there one only one season. For almost a year, Tinmar was a free agent. Then, in 1988, he signed for Division 3 side Châteauroux. His spell at the club lasted until 1989, as he then moved back to Martinique to play for Club Franciscain. Tinmar retired in 1993.

International career 
Having just won the 1993 Caribbean Cup with Martinique two months prior, Tinmar was included in the squad for the 1993 CONCACAF Gold Cup by manager Raymond Destin. He would go on to make three appearances in the tournament, playing in each of Martinique's three group stage games. Tinmar scored one goal for the team, an equalizer against Costa Rica in the final match. However, Martinique were eliminated, as they finished bottom of their group.

International goals

Managerial career 
Tinmar was the manager of New Star de Decos, a club in the Martinique Championnat National, from January to December 2017.

Honours 
Paris Saint-Germain
 Coupe de France runner-up: 1984–85

Martinique
 Caribbean Cup: 1993

References

External links 
 
 

1963 births
Living people
People from Le Lamentin
Martiniquais footballers
French footballers
Association football central defenders
Martinique international footballers
French football managers
French people of Martiniquais descent
Black French sportspeople
Paris Saint-Germain F.C. players
Stade Lavallois players
Red Star F.C. players
LB Châteauroux players
Club Franciscain players
Ligue 1 players
Ligue 2 players
French Division 3 (1971–1993) players